Brad Turner (born May 25, 1968) is a Canadian retired ice hockey player, who played 3 games in the National Hockey League with the New York Islanders during the 1991–92 season. The rest of his career, which lasted from 1990 to 1998, was spent in the minor leagues and in Europe.

Playing career
Turner was born in Winnipeg, Manitoba. As a youth, he played in the 1981 Quebec International Pee-Wee Hockey Tournament with a minor ice hockey team from Calgary.

Turner was drafted 58th overall by the Minnesota North Stars in the 1986 NHL Entry Draft and played three games for the New York Islanders in the 1991–92 NHL season.

Post-playing career
Turner currently works in the film industry as an actor and stunt performer. His roles include Vic Duguay in the 2004 hockey comedy-drama Chicks with Sticks. He has been an active supporter of research on long-term sequelae of traumatic brain injury.

Career statistics

Regular season and playoffs

References

External links
 
 

1968 births
Living people
Calgary Canucks players
Canadian expatriate ice hockey players in England
Canadian expatriate ice hockey players in Finland
Canadian ice hockey defencemen
Capital District Islanders players
Cornwall Aces players
Manchester Storm (1995–2002) players
Michigan Wolverines men's ice hockey players
Minnesota North Stars draft picks
New Haven Nighthawks players
New York Islanders players
Richmond Renegades players
Ice hockey people from Winnipeg
TuTo players
Wiener EV players